Raciti is an Italian surname. Notable people with the surname include:

 Filippo Raciti (1967–2007), Italian police officer
 Sonia Raciti (born 1989), South African model
 Travis Raciti (born 1992), American footballer

Italian-language surnames